Nabarlek may refer to:

 Nabarlek (Petrogale concinna), a small species of macropod
 Nabarlek (band), an Indigenous Roots band 
 Nabarlek Uranium Mine, an abandoned uranium mine